Oleksandr Shevchenko or Olexandr Shevchenko may refer to:

 Oleksandr Shevchenko (1937–2016), Ukrainian scientist and politician
 Oleksandr Shevchenko (footballer) (born 1992), Ukrainian footballer
 Olexandr Shevchenko (born 1971), Ukrainian entrepreneur and politician

See also
 Alexander Shevchenko (disambiguation)